Hamilton is an NJ Transit station on the Northeast Corridor Line, in Hamilton Township, Mercer County, New Jersey, United States. Also at this station is the NJ Transit Hamilton Township bus garage. The station is at 600 Sloan Avenue, off exit 65B of Interstate 295.

Hamilton Transit Center opened February 21, 1999 as an intermodal complex. It is next to a former American Standard factory that was redeveloped into an office building.

Peak express trains make the trip to New York Penn Station in about an hour, while off-peak express trains take an hour and fifteen minutes.

The Hamilton station received national media attention in 2019, when it was reported that commuters are regularly locked out of the station building on early mornings. The building, which houses a ticket office, waiting room, and Dunkin' Donuts shop, is to open at 4:30 a.m. every day with the opening of the donut shop; a Dunkin' Donuts employee is contracted to open the doors of the building at that time. The ticket office opens later each day, at 6 a.m., and the platforms and a small enclosed waiting area are always kept open.

Station layout
The station has two high-level side platforms connected by a passageway over the tracks. Amtrak's Northeast Corridor lines bypass the station via the inner tracks.

References

External links

NJ Transit Rail Operations stations
Stations on the Northeast Corridor
Railway stations in the United States opened in 1999
Railway stations in Mercer County, New Jersey
Hamilton Township, Mercer County, New Jersey